was a village located in Abe District, Shizuoka Prefecture, Japan.

On January 1, 1969 Ikawa joined with neighboring Shizuoka city. It is now part of Aoi-ku, Shizuoka.

As of January 1, 1969-final population data before the amalgamation, the town had an estimated population of 2,471 and a density of 4.95 persons per km². The total area was 498.90 km².

Ikawa, located in the mountainous area between Shizuoka and Yamanashi Prefecture is the location of Ikawa Dam, a major hydroelectric power plant for Shizuoka Prefecture. It is also a popular sightseeing location for local residents. "Ikawa Menpa" which is a lacquered hinoki wooden lunch box is a local speciality.

External links
Shizuoka City official website 

Dissolved municipalities of Shizuoka Prefecture